Die Wildecker Herzbuben are a German music group of the Volkstümliche Musik genre, coming from Wildeck in Hesse.

Discography 

 1990: Herzilein
 1991: Zwei Kerle wie wir
 1992: Das tut gut
 1992: Weihnachten zu Hause
 1993: Von Ganzem Herzen
 1993: Ist das nicht himmlisch
 1994: Am schönsten ist es daheim
 1995: Kuschelzeit
 1997: Weil wir Freunde sind
 1997: Die ewigen Juwelen der Volksmusik
 2000: Bubenstreiche
 2002: Die Sonne scheint auf alle gleich
 2003: Das Beste der Wildecker Herzbuben
 2004: Starcollection
 2005: So schön ist der Norden
 2006: Rutsch an meine Seite
 2007: Wahre Liebe
 2009: 20 Jahre Herzilein

Awards 
 Goldene Stimmgabel (1990 und 1991)
 multiple Goldene Schallplatte and Platin-Schallplatte
 Doppelplatin
 RSH-Gold by radio station Radio Schleswig-Holstein
 Edelweiß by magazine Frau im Spiegel
 Wilfried Gliem achieved honorary citizenship 2004 in his hometown Wildeck
 2012: Faustorden (a medal) of the Handwerker Carnevalsverein Weimar

External links
 Official web site 

German musical groups